Arquivo Público do Estado de São Paulo serves as the official archival repository for the state of São Paulo, Brazil, as well as the central agency in the System of Archives of the State of São Paulo, SAESP (Sistema de Arquivos do Estado de São Paulo).

See also

Public Archive for the State of Rio de Janeiro
Brazilian National Archives
List of archives in Brazil

References

External links
Official website 

Archives in Brazil
Government of São Paulo (state)
Buildings and structures in São Paulo